This article summarizes grammar in the Hawaiian language.

Syntax
Hawaiian is a predominantly verb–subject–object language. However, word order is flexible, and the emphatic word can be placed first in the sentence.  Hawaiian largely avoids subordinate clauses, and often uses a possessive construction instead. Hawaiian, unlike English, is a pro-drop language, meaning pronouns may be omitted when the meaning is clear from context.

The typical detailed word order is given by the following, with most items optional:

 Tense/aspect signs: i, ua, e, etc.
 Verb
 Qualifying adverb: mau, wale, ole, pu, etc.
 Passive sign:  ʻia
 Verbal directives: aku, mai, etc.
 Locatives nei or lā, or particles ana or ai
 Strengthening particle: nō
 Subject
 Object or predicate noun

Exceptions to VSO word order 
If the sentence has a negative mood and the subject is a pronoun, word order is subject–verb–object following the negator ʻaʻole, as in:

Another exception is when an emphatic adverbial phrase begins the sentence. In this case, a pronoun subject precedes the verb.

Interrogatives 
Yes-no questions can be unmarked and expressed by intonation, or they can be marked by placing anei after the leading word of the sentence. Examples of question-word questions include:

See also Hawaiian Language: Syntax and other resources .

Nouns
As Hawaiian does not particularly discern between word types, any verb can be nominalized by preceding it with the definite article, however, some words that are used as nouns are rarely or never used as verbs. Within the noun phrase, adjectives follow the noun (e.g. ka hale liilii "the house small", "the small house"), while possessors precede it (e.g. kou hale "your house"). Numerals precede the noun in the absence of the definite article, but follow the noun if the noun is preceded by the definite article.

Articles
Every noun is preceded by an article (ka‘i). The three main ones are:
 ke and ka – definitive singular – ke for words starting with letters k, e, a and o (usually memorised as ke ao "the cloud" rule) exceptions include words called nā kūʻēlula "the rule defiers" eg. ke pākaukau "the table", ke ʻō "the fork" and ke mele "the song"). For all other words ka is used.
 he – indefinite singular
 nā – plural (definite or indefinite)

Number
In noun phrases, two numbers (singular and plural) are distinguished. The singular articles ke and ka and the plural article nā are the only articles that mark number:
 ka pu‘u "the hill" vs. nā pu‘u "the hills"

In the absence of these articles, plurality is usually indicated by inserting the pluralizing particle mau immediately before the noun:
 he hale "a house" vs. he mau hale "houses"
 ko‘u hoaaloha "my friend" vs. ko‘u mau hoaaloha "my friends"

Most nouns don't change when pluralized; however, some nouns referring to people exhibit a lengthened vowel in the third syllable from the end in the plural:

 he wahine "a woman" vs. he mau wāhine "women"
 ka ‘elemakule "the old man" vs. nā ‘elemākule "the old men"
 ia kahuna "the aforementioned priest" vs. ia mau kāhuna "the aforementioned priests"

Gender
In Hawaiian, there is no gender distinction in the third person. The word for third person (he, she, it) is ia. It is commonly preceded by o as in o ia and, following standard modern orthographical rules, is written as two words, but it can be seen as one when written by older speakers and in historical documents.

Hawaiian nouns belong to one of two genders, this gender system is not based on biological sex. The two genders are known as the kino ʻō (o-class) and the kino ʻā (a-class). These classes are only taken into account when using the genitive case (see table of personal pronouns below).

Kino ʻō nouns, in general, are nouns whose creation cannot be controlled by the subject, such as inoa "name", puuwai "heart", and hale "house". Specific categories for o-class nouns include: modes of transportation (e.g. kaa "car" and lio "horse"), things that you can go into, sit on or wear (e.g., lumi "room",  noho "chair", eke "bag", and lole "clothes"), and people in your generation (e.g., siblings, cousins) and previous generations (e.g. makuahine "mother").

Kino ʻā nouns, in general, are those whose creation can be controlled, such as waihooluu "color", as in kau waihooluu punahele "my favorite color". Specific categories include: your boyfriend or girlfriend (ipo), spouse, friends, and future generations in your line (all of your descendants).

The change of preposition of o "of" (kino ʻō) to a "of "(kino ʻā) is especially important for prepositional and subordinate phrases:

 ka mea "the thing"
 kona mea "his thing (nonspecific)"
 kāna mea "his thing (which he created or somehow chose)"
 ka mea āna i ʻike ai "the thing that he saw"
 kāna (mea) i ʻike ai "what he saw"
 kēia ʻike ʻana āna "this thing that he saw (purposefully)"
 kēia ʻike ʻana ona "this thing that he saw (purportedly)" where the seeing isn't much import

Demonstrative determiners

Personal pronouns

Verbs

Tense, aspect, and mood

Verbs can be analytically modified to indicate tense, aspect and mood as follows:

 ua + verb: perfective aspect, past tense; or perfect tense/aspect (ua hana au "I worked", "I have worked"). Note that the pre-verbal marker ua is often omitted in speech.
 i + verb: past tense (i hana au "I worked"); or, perfect participle (i hana "having worked", "who had worked")
 e + verb + ana: imperfective aspect (e hana ana au "I was working", "I will be working")
 ke + verb + nei: present tense, progressive aspect (ke hana nei au "I am working")
 e + verb: future tense/mood (e hana au "I will work"); or, infinitive (e hana "to work"); or, imperative mood (e hana ʻoe "Work thou!")
 mai + verb: negative imperative mood (mai hana ʻoe  "Do not work thou!")
 verb + ʻia: passive voice where the agent is marked by e (Ua hana ʻia ka honua e ka Haku. The world was created by the Creator.)

In his "Introduction to Hawaiian Grammar," W.D. Alexander proposed that Hawaiian has a pluperfect tense as follows:
 ua + verb + ʻē: pluperfect tense/aspect (ua hana ʻē au "I had worked")
However, this is debatable since ʻē simply means "beforehand, in advance, already".  Andrews [Gram. 1.4] suggested the same thing that Alexander forwards. However, Ua hana ʻē au could mean both "I have already worked", "I already worked", and (depending on the temporal context) "I had worked previous to that moment." "Already" is the operative unifier for these constructions as well as the perfective quality denoted by ua. ʻĒ therefore is acting like a regular Hawaiian adverb, following the verb it modifies:

 Ua hana paha au. Perhaps I worked.
 Ua hana mālie au. I worked steadily, without disruption.
 Ua hana naʻe au. I even worked.

Equative sentences 
Hawaiian does not have a copula verb meaning "to be" nor does it have a verb meaning "to have". Equative sentences are used to convey this group of ideas. All equative sentences in Hawaiian are zero-tense/mood (i.e., they cannot be modified by verbal markers, particles or adverbs).

Pepeke ʻAike He "A is a B" 
Pepeke ʻAike He is the name for the simple equative sentence "A is a(n) B". The pattern is "He B (ʻo) A." ʻO marks the third person singular pronoun ia (which means "he/she/it") and all proper nouns.

 He kaikamahine ʻo Mary. Mary is a girl.
 He kaikamahine ʻo ia. She is a girl.
 He Hawaiʻi kēlā kaikamahine. That girl is (a) Hawaiian.
 He haumana ke keiki. The child is a student.

Pepeke ʻAike ʻO 
Pepeke ʻAike ʻO is the name for the simple equative sentence "A is B." The pattern is " ʻO A (ʻo) B," where the order of the nouns is interchangeable and where ʻo invariably marks the third person singular pronoun ia and all proper nouns (regardless of where it is in the utterance).

 ʻO Mary ʻo ia. ʻO ia ʻo Mary. She is Mary.
 ʻO Mary nō ia. ʻO ia nō ʻo Mary. It's Mary.
 ʻO wau ʻo Mary. ʻO Mary wau. I'm Mary.
 ʻO ʻoe ʻo Mary. ʻO Mary ʻoe. You are Mary.
 ʻO Mary ke kaikamahine. ʻO ke kaikamahine ʻo Mary. Mary is the girl. The girl is Mary.
 ʻO ka haumana ke keiki. ʻO ke keiki ka haumana. The student is the child. The child is the student.

Pepeke Henua (Locational equative) 
Pepeke Henua is the name for the simple equative sentence "A is located (in/on/at/etc. B)." The pattern is "Aia (ʻo) A..."

 Aia ʻo Mary ma Hilo. Mary is in Hilo.
 Aia ʻo ia maloko o ka wai. He/she/it is inside (of) the water.
 Aia ka haumana mahea? Aia mahea ka haumana? Where is the student?

Pepeke ʻAike Na 
Pepeke ʻAike Na is the name of the simple equative sentence "A belongs to B." The pattern is "Na (B) A." The singular pronouns undergo predictable changes.

Pepeke ʻAike Na Examples:

Naʻu ke kaʻa. The car belongs to me. That's my car.

Na Mary ke keiki. The child is Mary's. It's Mary's child.

Nāna ka penikala. The pencil belongs to him/her/it.

Nāu nō au. I belong to you. I'm yours.

Note:

ʻO kēia ke kaʻa nāu. This is the car I'm giving to you.

He makana kēlā na ke aliʻi. This is a present for the chief.

Other verbal particles

Other post-verbal markers include

 verb + mai: "toward the speaker"
 verb + aku: "away from the speaker"
 verb + iho: "down"
 verb + aʻe: "up", "adjacent"
 stative verb + iā + agent: agent marker

Causative verb creation

Causative verbs can be created from nouns and adjectives by using the prefix ho'o-, as illustrated in the following:

 nani "pretty"; hoʻonani "to beautify"
 nui "large"; hoʻonui "to enlarge"
 hui "club"; hoʻohui "to form a club"

Reduplication

Reduplication can emphasize or otherwise alter the meaning of a word.  Examples are:

 ʻau "to swim"; ʻauʻau "to bathe"
 haʻi "to say"; haʻihaʻi "to speak back and forth"
 maʻi "sick"; maʻimaʻi "chronically sick"

References

 

Grammar
Austronesian grammars